Demodes is a genus of longhorn beetles of the subfamily Lamiinae, containing the following species:

 Demodes albomaculata Breuning, 1939
 Demodes bimaculata Breuning, 1947
 Demodes conspersa (Aurivillius, 1914)
 Demodes frenata (Pascoe, 1857)
 Demodes immunda Newman, 1842
 Demodes javanica Breuning, 1950
 Demodes malaccensis (Breuning, 1935)
 Demodes mindanaonis Breuning, 1939
 Demodes siporensis Breuning, 1939
 Demodes subconspersa Breuning, 1950
 Demodes vittata Gahan, 1906

References

Mesosini